In mathematics, the Fourier sine and cosine transforms are forms of the Fourier transform that do not use complex numbers or require negative frequency. They are the forms originally used by Joseph Fourier and are still preferred in some applications, such as signal processing or statistics.

Definition

If  means time, then  is frequency in cycles per unit time, but in the abstract, they can be any pair of variables which are dual to each other.

This transform is necessarily an odd function of frequency, i.e. for all :

The numerical factors in the Fourier transforms are defined uniquely only by their product.  Here, in order that the Fourier inversion formula not have any numerical factor, the factor of 2 appears because the sine function has  norm of 

It is necessarily an even function of frequency, i.e. for all :
Since positive frequencies can fully express the transform, the non-trivial concept of negative frequency needed in the regular Fourier transform can be avoided.

Simplification to avoid negative t 
Since cosine is also even, a simpler formula can be used, 
 

Similarly, if  is an odd function, then the cosine transform is zero and the sine transform can be simplified to

Other conventions 
Just like the Fourier transform takes the form of different equations with different constant factors (see ), other authors also define the cosine transform as

and sine as

And while  is typically used to represent the time domain,  is often used alternatively, particularly when representing frequencies in a spatial domain.

Fourier inversion
The original function  can be recovered from its transform under the usual hypotheses, that  and both of its transforms should be absolutely integrable. For more details on the different hypotheses, see Fourier inversion theorem.

The inversion formula is

which has the advantage that all quantities are real. Using the addition formula for cosine, this can be rewritten as

If the original function  is an even function, then the sine transform is zero; if  is an odd function, then the cosine transform is zero. In either case, the inversion formula simplifies.

Relation with complex exponentials
The form of the Fourier transform used more often today is

Numerical evaluation

Using standard methods of numerical evaluation for Fourier integrals, such as Gaussian or tanh-sinh quadrature, is likely to lead to completely incorrect results, as the quadrature sum is (for most integrands of interest) highly ill-conditioned.
Special numerical methods which exploit the structure of the oscillation are required, an example of which is Ooura's method for Fourier integrals This method attempts to evaluate the integrand at locations which asymptotically approach the zeros of the oscillation (either the sine or cosine), quickly reducing the magnitude of positive and negative terms which are summed.

See also
Discrete cosine transform
Discrete sine transform

References
 Whittaker, Edmund, and James Watson, A Course in Modern Analysis, Fourth Edition, Cambridge Univ. Press, 1927, pp. 189, 211

Integral transforms
Fourier analysis
Mathematical physics